The Legendary Majik Mijits is an album that was recorded by former Small Faces members Steve Marriott and Ronnie Lane when they reformed under the name of Majik Mijits in 1981 and gave a one-off concert at the Bridgehouse pub in East London. The lineup included Jim Leverton, Mick Green, Mick Weaver, Dave Hynes and Sam Brown.

Track listing

Personnel 
Steve Marriott – guitar, vocals
Ronnie Lane – bass guitar, vocals
Mick Green – guitar
Mick Weaver – keyboards
Jim Leverton – bass guitar
Dave Hynes – drums
Sam Brown – backing vocals

References

2000 debut albums